Aminul Islam Badsha (14 April 1929 – 4 August 1998) was a Bangladeshi language movement activist and freedom fighter. In recognition of his contribution in the Bengali Language Movement in 1952, the government of Bangladesh awarded him the country's second highest civilian award Ekushey Padak posthumously in 2020.

References 

1929 births
People from Pabna District
Recipients of the Ekushey Padak
1998 deaths
Bengali language movement activists